Amphelasma is a genus of skeletonizing leaf beetles and flea beetles in the family Chrysomelidae. There are 11 described species in Amphelasma, distributed from Venezuela to Mexico, with one species (Amphelasma cavum) ranging in southern Arizona.

Selected species
 Amphelasma bipuncticolle 
 Amphelasma cavum 
 Amphelasma decoratum 
 Amphelasma trilineatum 
 Amphelasma unilineatum

References

Further reading

 
 
 
 

Galerucinae
Chrysomelidae genera
Articles created by Qbugbot
Taxa named by Herbert Spencer Barber